Heaslip House is an academic building located at 297 Victoria Street in Toronto, Ontario, Canada. It is home to the G. Raymond Chang School of Continuing Education at Toronto Metropolitan University.

A new 7-storey addition, designed by Rounthwaite Dick & Hadley Architects, opened in the fall of 2005. It incorporates the façade of the O'Keefe Building, a 5-storey structure that was designed around 1938 by Toronto architect Alfred H. Chapman as the head office of tycoon E. P. Taylor's Canadian Breweries Limited. The O'Keefe Building's façade has limestone cladding, and there is an elaborate carving above the main entrance.

The building is named for Bill and Nona (Macdonald) Heaslip. The Continuing Education School is named for businessman G. Raymond Chang, who served as CEO of CI Financial.

The building is made mostly of glass panels and copper sheets. The structure is cantilevered over the Devonian Square reflecting pond, which becomes a skating rink for recreational use in winter.

References
 Heaslip House
 Ryerson's Heaslip House opens its doors to The Chang School

External links

 Heaslip House – Architectural Conservancy Ontario
 297 Victoria Street, Toronto – ERA Architects

Toronto Metropolitan University buildings